Palkanlu may refer to:
 Palkanlu-ye Bala, North Khorasan Province
 Palkanlu-ye Pain, North Khorasan Province
 Palkanlu-ye Olya, Razavi Khorasan Province
 Palkanlu-ye Sofla, Razavi Khorasan Province